Ponnagaram is a 1980 Indian Tamil-language film written and directed by K. S. Madhangan, starring Sarath Babu and Shoba. It was released on 4 July 1980, two months after Shoba's death.

Plot

Cast 
Sarath Babu
Shoba as Bhavani
Suruli Rajan
Sachu
Sri Kumar
I. Lavanya
V. S. Raghavan

Production 
The title of the film is a reference to a short story of the same name by Pulamaipithan.

Soundtrack 
The music was composed by Shankar–Ganesh. The song "Vaazhukindra Makkalukku" is lyricist Kamakodeyen's debut.

Reception 
P. S. M. of Kalki felt Madhangan gave himself work overload by handling both writing and directing, and criticised him for trying to capitalise on Shoba's death.

References

External links 
 

1980 films
1980s Tamil-language films
Films scored by Shankar–Ganesh